Sari Miri (also Romanized as Sārī Mīrī; also known as Sarimiri) is a village in Kuhdasht-e Jonubi Rural District, in the Central District of Kuhdasht County, Lorestan Province, Iran. At the 2006 census, its population was 418, in 83 families.

References 

Towns and villages in Kuhdasht County